WKMI (1360 AM) is a radio station licensed to Kalamazoo, Michigan broadcasting a news-talk format.

WKMI is an affiliate of the Grand Valley State Laker football radio network.

WKMI, which began broadcasting in 1947, was a highly rated Top 40 music station from the 1950s through the 1970s.  The station moved to an Adult Contemporary format to compete with WKZO during the early 1980s, and then switched to its current talk format in 1990 as the Persian Gulf War created a boom for talk radio.

An FM sister at 106.5 was added in 1964; WKMI-FM is now WVFM and no longer co-owned.

On August 30, 2013, a deal was announced in which Townsquare Media would acquire 53 stations from Cumulus Media, including WKMI, for $238 million. The deal was part of Cumulus' acquisition of Dial Global; Townsquare and Dial Global were both controlled by Oaktree Capital Management. The sale to Townsquare was completed on November 14, 2013.

References

Michiguide.com - WKMI History

External links

KMI
News and talk radio stations in the United States
Radio stations established in 1964
Townsquare Media radio stations